Tjebu or Djew-Qa, was an ancient Egyptian city located on the eastern bank of the Nile in what is now Asyut Governorate, Egypt. In Greek and Roman Egypt, its name was Antaeopolis after its tutelary deity, the war god known by the Hellenized name Antaeus. Its modern name is Qau el-Kebir or more commonly El Etmannyieh.

Several large terraced funerary complexes in Tjebu by officials of the 10th nome during the Twelfth and Thirteenth dynasties represent the peak of non-royal funerary architecture of the Middle Kingdom. Cemeteries of different dates were also found in the area. The tomb of the local governor May dates to the New Kingdom. A Ptolemaic temple of Ptolemy IV Philopator, enlarged and restored under Ptolemy VI Philometor and Marcus Aurelius, was destroyed in the first half of the nineteenth century.

The temple in this town was large, comparatively speaking—an 18-column pronaos, with a twelve-column hypostyle hall preceding the vestibule hall, the inner sanctum, and two flanking chambers of equal size.

The edifice was dedicated primarily to "Antaeus", who represented a warrior fusion of Seth and Horus. This deity's name is written with an obscure hieroglyph (G7a or G7b in the standard Gardiner list), which gives no clue as to the pronunciation. Modern Egyptologists read the name as Nemtiwey.

Nephthys was the primary goddess who received worship in this temple, or perhaps in an adjunct shrine of her own, as the corresponding female power of Nemtiwey. A Prophet of Nephthys is attested for Tjebu. In cliffside quarries not far from the ancient site, visitors can see notable reliefs of both Antaeus and Nephthys. At the same time, the site has again drawn most of its interest since 19th- and early 20th-century archaeologists have studied the maze of relatively well-preserved tombs in the district.

See also
 List of ancient Egyptian towns and cities

References

Sources

Alexander Ilin-Tomich (2018) The Governor's Court in Late Middle Kingdom Antaeopolis, Revue d'égyptologie 68:61-78, DOI:10.2143/RE.68.0.3285267 

Cities in ancient Egypt
Populated places in Asyut Governorate
Former populated places in Egypt